Kevin Hunt may refer to:

 Kevin Hunt (footballer, born 1975), English football player
 Kevin Hunt (American football) (1948–2015), American football player
 Kevin Hunt (Australian footballer) (1933–2016), Australian rules footballer
 Kevin Hunt (British Midland Flight 92), British Midland pilot
 Kevin Hunt (anthropologist)
 Kevin Hunt (musician), Australian jazz pianist and composer